Xh or XH may refer to:

 Xh (digraph)
 Chi Heorot, a fraternity at Dartmouth College
 Mexico (International Telecommunication Union callsign prefix XH)
 Xhosa language (ISO 639 alpha-2 code "xh")